Bearberry is three species of shrubs in the genus Arctostaphylos.
 Arctostaphylos alpina, alpine bearberry
 Arctostaphylos rubra, red fruit bearberry
 Arctostaphylos uva-ursi, common bearberry

Bearberry may also refer to:
 Arbutus menziesii, a tree native to North America
 Rhamnus purshiana, a species of American buckthorn 
 Cranberry, evergreen dwarf shrubs in the genus Vaccinium